Morden Regional Aerodrome  is located  northeast of Morden, Manitoba, Canada.

References

Registered aerodromes in Manitoba
Morden, Manitoba